In organic chemistry, a functional group is a substituent or moiety in a molecule that causes the molecule's characteristic chemical reactions. The same functional group will undergo the same or similar chemical reactions regardless of the rest of the molecule's composition. This enables systematic prediction of chemical reactions and behavior of chemical compounds and the design of chemical synthesis. The reactivity of a functional group can be modified by other functional groups nearby. Functional group interconversion can be used in retrosynthetic analysis to plan organic synthesis.

A functional group is a group of atoms in a molecule with distinctive chemical properties, regardless of the other atoms in the molecule. The atoms in a functional group are linked to each other and to the rest of the molecule by covalent bonds. For repeating units of polymers, functional groups attach to their nonpolar core of carbon atoms and thus add chemical character to carbon chains. Functional groups can also be charged, e.g. in carboxylate salts (–COO−), which turns the molecule into a polyatomic ion or a complex ion. Functional groups binding to a central atom in a coordination complex are called ligands. Complexation and solvation are also caused by specific interactions of functional groups. In the common rule of thumb "like dissolves like", it is the shared or mutually well-interacting functional groups which give rise to solubility. For example, sugar dissolves in water because both share the hydroxyl functional group (–OH) and hydroxyls interact strongly with each other. Plus, when functional groups are more electronegative than atoms they attach to, the functional groups will become polar, and the otherwise nonpolar molecules containing these functional groups become polar and so become soluble in some aqueous environment.

Combining the names of functional groups with the names of the parent alkanes generates what is termed a systematic nomenclature for naming organic compounds. In traditional nomenclature, the first carbon atom after the carbon that attaches to the functional group is called the alpha carbon; the second, beta carbon, the third, gamma carbon, etc. If there is another functional group at a carbon, it may be named with the Greek letter, e.g., the gamma-amine in gamma-aminobutyric acid is on the third carbon of the carbon chain attached to the carboxylic acid group. IUPAC conventions call for numeric labeling of the position, e.g. 4-aminobutanoic acid. In traditional names various qualifiers are used to label isomers, for example, isopropanol (IUPAC name: propan-2-ol) is an isomer of n-propanol (propan-1-ol). The term moiety has some overlap with the term "functional group". However, a moiety is an entire "half" of a molecule, which can be not only a single functional group, but also a larger unit consisting of multiple functional groups. For example, an "aryl moiety" may be any group containing an aromatic ring, regardless of how many functional groups the said aryl has.

Table of common functional groups
The following is a list of common functional groups. In the formulas, the symbols R and R' usually denote an attached hydrogen, or a hydrocarbon side chain of any length, but may sometimes refer to any group of atoms.

Hydrocarbons
Hydrocarbons are a class of molecule that is defined by functional groups called hydrocarbyls that contain only carbon and hydrogen, but vary in the number and order of double bonds. Each one differs in type (and scope) of reactivity.

There are also a large number of branched or ring alkanes that have specific names, e.g., tert-butyl, bornyl, cyclohexyl, etc. Hydrocarbons may form charged structures: positively charged carbocations or negative carbanions. Carbocations are often named -um. Examples are tropylium and triphenylmethyl cations and the cyclopentadienyl anion.

Groups containing halogen
Haloalkanes are a class of molecule that is defined by a carbon–halogen bond. This bond can be relatively weak (in the case of an iodoalkane) or quite stable (as in the case of a fluoroalkane). In general, with the exception of fluorinated compounds, haloalkanes readily undergo nucleophilic substitution reactions or elimination reactions. The substitution on the carbon, the acidity of an adjacent proton, the solvent conditions, etc. all can influence the outcome of the reactivity.

Groups containing oxygen
Compounds that contain C-O bonds each possess differing reactivity based upon the location and hybridization of the C-O bond, owing to the electron-withdrawing effect of sp-hybridized oxygen (carbonyl groups) and the donating effects of sp2-hybridized oxygen (alcohol groups).

Groups containing nitrogen
Compounds that contain nitrogen in this category may contain C-O bonds, such as in the case of amides.

Groups containing sulfur
Compounds that contain sulfur exhibit unique chemistry due to sulfur's ability to form more bonds than oxygen, its lighter analogue on the periodic table. Substitutive nomenclature (marked as prefix in table) is preferred over functional class nomenclature (marked as suffix in table) for sulfides, disulfides, sulfoxides and sulfones.

Groups containing phosphorus
Compounds that contain phosphorus exhibit unique chemistry due to the ability of phosphorus to form more bonds than nitrogen, its lighter analogue on the periodic table.

Groups containing boron
Compounds containing boron exhibit unique chemistry due to their having partially filled octets and therefore acting as Lewis acids.

Groups containing metals 

 Fluorine is too electronegative to be bonded to magnesium; it becomes an ionic salt instead.

Names of radicals or moieties
These names are used to refer to the moieties themselves or to radical species, and also to form the names of halides and substituents in larger molecules.

When the parent hydrocarbon is unsaturated, the suffix ("-yl", "-ylidene", or "-ylidyne") replaces "-ane" (e.g. "ethane" becomes "ethyl"); otherwise, the suffix replaces only the final "-e" (e.g. "ethyne" becomes "ethynyl").

When used to refer to moieties, multiple single bonds differ from a single multiple bond. For example, a methylene bridge (methanediyl) has two single bonds, whereas a methylene group (methylidene) has one double bond. Suffixes can be combined, as in methylidyne (triple bond) vs. methylylidene (single bond and double bond) vs. methanetriyl (three double bonds).

There are some retained names, such as methylene for methanediyl, 1,x-phenylene for phenyl-1,x-diyl (where x is 2, 3, or 4), carbyne for methylidyne, and trityl for triphenylmethyl.

See also
 :Category:Functional groups
 Group contribution method

References

External links

 IUPAC Blue Book (organic nomenclature)
 
 Functional group video 

 
Organic chemistry